Elisabeth Risdon (born Daisy Cartwright Risdon; 26 April 1887 – 20 December 1958) was an English film actress. She appeared in more than 140 films between 1913 and 1952. A beauty in her youth, she usually played in society parts. In later years in films she switched to playing character parts.

Biography
Born in London as Daisy Cartwright Risdon, the daughter of John Jenkins Risdon and Martha Harrop Risdon, she graduated from the Royal Academy of Arts in 1918 with high honours. 

She attracted the attention of George Bernard Shaw and was cast as the lead in his biggest plays. Besides her performances for Shaw, she was leading lady for actors including George Arliss, Otis Skinner, and William Faversham. She was also under contract with the Theatre Guild for many years.

Risdon's film debut came in England, where she made 13 silent films. She came to the United States in 1912, and her first film with sound was Guard That Girl (1935).

Her Broadway credits include Laburnum Grove (1935), Big Hearted Herbert (1934), Uncle Tom's Cabin (1933), For Services Rendered (1933), We Never Learn (1928), The Springboard (1927), Right You Are If You Think You Are (1927), The Silver Cord (1926), A Proud Woman (1926), Lovely Lady (1925), The Enchanted April (1925), Thrills (1925), Artistic Temperament (1924), Cock O' the Roost (1924), The Lady (1923), The Nightcap (1921), Heartbreak House (1920), Footloose (1920), Dear Brutus (1918), Humpty Dumpty (1918), Muggins (1918), Seven Days' Leave (1918), Misalliance (1917), The Morris Dance (1917), The Poetasters of Ispahan (1912), Beauty and the Jacobin (1912), and Fanny's First Play (1912).

In 1916, she married silent film director George Loane Tucker, who died in 1921. In 1938, she married actor Brandon Evans, who died in April 1958. She was the great-aunt of actress Wendy Barrie-Wilson.

Death
Risdon died in December 1958 in St John's Hospital in Santa Monica, California from a cerebral haemorrhage. Her body was donated to medical science.

Partial filmography

 Maria Marten (1913 short) - Maria Marten
 The Suicide Club (1914) - Zephyrine
 The Loss of the Birkenhead (1914) - Deborah
 Her Luck in London (1914) - Nellie Harbourne
 The Idol of Paris (1914) - Flare-Flare
 Honeymoon for Three (1915) - Molly Van Dam
 Gilbert Gets Tiger-It is (1915 short) - Mrs. Gilbert
 From Shopgirl to Duchess (1915) - Sylvia Gray
 Florence Nightingale (1915) - Florence Nightingale
 Her Nameless Child (1915) - Phyllis / Alice Ford
 Home (1915) - Joan Bicester
 The Christian (1915) - Gloria Quayle
 Love in a Wood (1915) - Rosiland
 Fine Feathers (1915) - Meg Roberts
 Charity Ann (1915) - Ann Charity
 A Will of Her Own (1915) - Isabel Stanton
 Meg the Lady (1916) - Lady Brisby
 Esther (1916 short) - Esther
 Driven (1916) - Katherine Crichton
 The Hypocrites (1916) - Rachel Neve
 The Princess of Happy Chance (1916) - Princess Felicia / Lucidora Eden
 The Manxman (1916) - Kate Gregeen
 Mother Love (1916) - Mary
 Smith (1917) - Smith
 The Mother of Dartmoor (1917) - Avesa Pomeroy
 Guard That Girl (1935) - Aunt Catherine
 Crime and Punishment (1935) - Mrs. Raskolnikov
 Lady of Secrets (1936) - Mrs. Emily Whittaker
 Don't Gamble with Love (1936) - Grace
 The King Steps Out (1936) - Grand Duchess Sofia
 The Final Hour (1936) - Fortune Teller
 Craig's Wife (1936) - Mrs. Landreth
 Theodora Goes Wild (1936) - Aunt Mary
 The Woman I Love (1937) - Mme. Herbillion
 Mountain Justice (1937) - Meg Harkins
 Make Way for Tomorrow (1937) - Cora Payne
 They Won't Forget (1937) - Mrs. Hale
 Dead End (1937) - Mrs. Connell
 Mannequin (1937) - Mrs.Cassidy
 Mad About Music (1938) - Annette Fusenot
 My Bill (1938) - Aunt Caroline
 Cowboy from Brooklyn (1938) - Mrs. Jordan
 The Affairs of Annabel (1938) - Mrs. Fletcher
 Girls on Probation (1938) - Kate Heath
 Tom Sawyer, Detective (1938) - Aunt Sally
 The Great Man Votes (1939) - Phoebe Ainslee
 The Adventures of Huckleberry Finn (1939) - Widow Douglass
 The Man Who Dared (1939) - Jessie Carter
 Sorority House (1939) - Mrs. Scott
 The Girl from Mexico (1939) - Aunt Della Lindsay
 Five Came Back (1939) - Martha Spengler
 The Forgotten Woman (1939) - Margaret Burke
 Full Confession (1939) - Norah O'Keefe
 Disputed Passage (1939) - Mrs. Cunningham
 The Roaring Twenties (1939) - Mrs. Sherman
 Mexican Spitfire (1940) - Aunt Della Lindsay
 The Man Who Wouldn't Talk (1940) - Jury Member
 Abe Lincoln in Illinois (1940) - Sarah Lincoln
 Honeymoon Deferred (1940) - Sarah Frome
 Ma! He's Making Eyes at Me (film) (1940) - Minerva
 Saturday's Children (1940) - Mrs. Halevy
 Sing, Dance, Plenty Hot (1940) - Agatha
 The Howards of Virginia (1940) - Aunt Clarissa
 Slightly Tempted (1940) - Ethelreda Knox
 Let's Make Music (1941) - Malvina Adams
 High Sierra (1941) - Ma
 Nice Girl? (1941) - Martha Peasley
 Mr. Dynamite (1941) - Achilles
 Footlight Fever (1941) - Aunt Hattie Drake
 The Mexican Spitfire's Baby (1941) - Aunt Della
 Paris Calling (1941) - Madame Jennetier
 Jail House Blues (1942) - Mrs. Alyosius McGonigle McGann
 The Man Who Returned to Life (1942) - Minerva Sunday
 The Lady Is Willing (1942) - Mrs. Cummings
 Mexican Spitfire at Sea (1942) - Aunt Della Lindsay
 Reap the Wild Wind (1942) - Mrs. Claiborne
 Are Husbands Necessary? (1942) - Mrs. Westwood
 I Live on Danger (1942) - Mrs. Morrell
 Mexican Spitfire Sees a Ghost (1942) - Aunt Della Lindsay
 Mexican Spitfire's Elephant (1942) - Aunt Della Lindsay
 Journey for Margaret (1942) - Mrs. Bailey
 Random Harvest (1942) - Mrs. Lloyd
 The Amazing Mrs. Holliday (1943) - Louise Holliday
 Mexican Spitfire's Blessed Event (1943) - Aunt Della Lindsay
 Never a Dull Moment (1943) - Mrs. Schuyler Manning III
 Higher and Higher (1943) - Mrs. Georgia Keating
 Weird Woman (1944) - Grace Gunnison
 The Canterville Ghost (1944) - Mrs. Polverdine
 In the Meantime, Darling (1944) - Mrs. Helen Corkery
 Tall in the Saddle (1944) - Miss Elizabeth Martin
 Blonde Fever (1944) - Mrs. Talford
 Grissly's Millions (1945) - Leona Palmor
 A Song for Miss Julie (1945) - Mrs. Ambrose Charteris
 The Unseen (1945) - Mrs. Norris
 Mama Loves Papa (1945) - Jessie Todd
 The Fighting Guardsman (1946) - Mme. de Montrevel (uncredited)
 They Made Me a Killer (1946) - 'Ma' Conley
 The Walls Came Tumbling Down (1946) - Catherine Walsh
 Lover Come Back (1946) - 'Ma' Williams
 Roll on Texas Moon (1946) - Cactus Kate Taylor
 The Shocking Miss Pilgrim (1947) - Mrs. Prichard
 The Egg and I (1947) - Betty's Mother
 The Romance of Rosy Ridge (1947) - Emily Baggett
 Life with Father (1947) - Mrs. Whitehead
 Mourning Becomes Electra (1947) - Mrs. Hills
 High Wall (1947) - Mrs. Kenet
 The Bride Goes Wild (1948) - Mrs. Carruthers
 Bodyguard (1948) - Gene Dysen
 Sealed Verdict (1948) - Mrs. Hockland
 Every Girl Should Be Married (1948) - Mary Nolan
 Down Dakota Way (1949) - Dolly Paxton
 Guilty of Treason (1950) - Mother Mindszenty
 The Secret Fury (1950) - Dr. Twining
 Sierra (1950) - Aunt Susan
 Hills of Oklahoma (1950) - Kate Carney
 Bunco Squad (1950) - Jessica Royce
 The Milkman (1950) - Mrs. Laura Carter
 My True Story (1951) - Mme. Rousseau
 In Old Amarillo (1951) - Granny Adams
 Bannerline (1951) - Mrs. Margaret Trimble
 It's a Big Country (1951) - Diner on Train (uncredited)
 Scaramouche (1952) - Isabelle de Valmorin

References

External links
 
 

1887 births
1958 deaths
Actresses from London
20th-century English actresses
English film actresses
English silent film actresses
English stage actresses
British expatriate actresses in the United States